Armenia Fund (full name Hayastan All Armenian Fund) was established in 1994 in Los Angeles, California. Armenia Fund, Inc. is a 501(c)(3) tax-exempt, non-governmental, non-political corporation. Serving as the United States’ Western Region affiliate of the “Hayastan” All-Armenian Fund along with its nineteen subsidiaries around the world, Armenia Fund, Inc. has issued over $120 million of electricity development guarantee and humanitarian revenue for Armenia. Lately the government of Armenia has been contributing to the fund since the fund has been receiving less support and not being able to meet its initial goals.

Goals 
Armenia Fund attempts to rebuild Armenia's economy and assist in the well-being of life in the region.  Additionally, the organization attempts to rebuild major infrastructures damaged in Karabakh during the first Nagorno-Karabakh War. The Fund has adopted a policy to go “Beyond Bricks and Mortar” to provide sustainability for projects it sponsors.

Network 
“Hayastan” All-Armenian Fund, Armenia Fund USA Inc.'s parent organization, through its affiliate organizations has presence in 16 countries around the world: United States, Canada, Brazil, Argentina, Great Britain, France, Netherlands, Germany, Switzerland, Austria, Sweden, Greece, Cyprus, Lebanon, Syria, and Australia.

Corporate Board of Armenia Fund USA Inc. 

 Maria Mehranian, President/Chairman;
 Armenian Assembly of America;
 Armenian Cultural Foundation;
 Armenian Catholic Eparchy of U.S. and Canada;
 Armenian Evangelical Union of North America;
 Armenian General Benevolent Union;
 Armenian Relief Society of Western U.S.A.;
 Nor Serount Cultural Association;
 Nor Or Charitable Foundation;
 Western Diocese of the Armenian Apostolic Church of America;
 Western Prelacy of the Armenian Apostolic Church of North America;

Famous Donors 
Some of the most famous donors and supporters of Armenia Fund include Kirk Kerkorian, the Kardashians, Serj Tankian of System of a Down and Cher. In 2020, due to the Nagorno-Karabakh(Artsakh) war, Kim Kardashian donated $1 Million. System of a Down released two new songs after 15 years, donating all the proceeds to Armenia Fund. As of December 2020, they had raised nearly $1 Million as a result.

Telethon 
Beginning in 1997, an annual telethon was set up and televised across the globe. The annual telethon takes place on Thanksgiving Day on various Armenian TV channels worldwide. On October 10, 2020, a special edition telethon took place to collect funds due to the 2020 war that broke out between Azerbaijan and Artsakh.

See also 
 Pan-European Phoneathon

References

External links 
 Official Website
 Armenia Fund on Armeniapedia

Armenian-American culture in California
Companies established in 1994